The Kid from Amarillo is a 1951 American Western film directed by Ray Nazarro and starring Charles Starrett, Smiley Burnette and Harry Lauter. It is part of the Durango Kid series. In Britain it was released under the alternative title Silver Chains.

The film's sets were designed by the art director Charles Clague, with location shooting taking place at the Iverson Ranch.

Plot

Cast
 Charles Starrett as Steve Ransom / The Durango Kid 
 Smiley Burnette as Smiley Burnette 
 Harry Lauter as Tom Mallory 
 Fred F. Sears as Jonathan Cole 
 Don Megowan as Rakim 
 Scott Lee as Snead 
 Guy Teague as Dirk 
 Charles Evans as Jason Summerville 
 George J. Lewis as Don José Figaroa 
 Henry Kulky as Zeno 
 George Chesebro as El Loco 
 The Cass County Boys as The Cass County Boys

References

Bibliography
 Pitts, Michael R. Western Movies: A Guide to 5,105 Feature Films. McFarland, 2012.

External links
 

1951 films
1951 Western (genre) films
1950s English-language films
American Western (genre) films
Films directed by Ray Nazarro
Columbia Pictures films
American black-and-white films
Films set in Texas
1950s American films